SSSIs in the UK are notified using the concept of an Area of Search (AOS), an area of between  and  in size. The Areas of Search were conceived and developed between 1975 and 1979 by the Nature Conservancy Council (NCC), based on regions created by the Local Government Act 1972. Whereas England had its Areas of Search based on 46 counties, those in Wales were based on a combination of the counties and smaller districts. In 1974, Wales was divided into 8 counties, with 37 districts. The NCC created 12 Welsh Areas of Search; they mostly follow county borders, but the larger counties (Dyfed, Powys and Gwynedd) were divided into multiple Areas using district borders. Mid and South Glamorgan were merged into a single AOS, whilst Llanelli district was included in the West Glamorgan AOS.

Due to subsequent local government reorganisation in the UK since 1972, many counties and districts have been divided, merged or renamed. Using the AOS system alone would make it difficult to search for individual SSSI citations via the Countryside Council for Wales (CCW) database without knowing 1972 region divisions. As a result, the CCW groups Welsh SSSIs using the subdivisions of Wales formed in April 1996 by the Local Government (Wales) Act 1994, resulting in 22 principal areas.

Gwent AOS lies within the counties of Blaenau Gwent, Caerphilly, Monmouthshire, Newport, and Torfaen.

For SSSIs elsewhere in the UK, see List of SSSIs by Area of Search.

See also
List of Sites of Special Scientific Interest in Blaenau Gwent
List of Sites of Special Scientific Interest in Caerphilly
List of Sites of Special Scientific Interest in Monmouthshire
List of Sites of Special Scientific Interest in Newport
List of Sites of Special Scientific Interest in Torfaen

References

 
Gwent